The 490s decade ran from January 1, 490, to December 31, 499.

Significant people
 Abba Afse, Abuna of Ethiopia
 Anastasius II, Pope of the Roman Catholic Church, p. 496–498
 Mar Aqaq-Acace, Patriarch of the Assyrian Church of the East, 484–496
 Arthur, dux bellorum (leader of battles) and King of the Brythons of later legend
 Mar Babai I, Patriarch of the Assyrian Church of the East, 497–503
 Benedict of Nursia, founder of Western Christian monasticism
 Cerdic of Wessex, Saxon invader and future king and founder of the Kingdom of Wessex
 Cynric of Wessex, Saxon invader and future king of Wessex
 Euphemius, Patriarch of Constantinople, 489–495
 Felix II (excluding Antipope Felix II), Pope of the Roman Catholic Church, p. 483–492
 Gelasius I, Pope of the Roman Catholic Church, p. 492–496
 Macedonius II, Patriarch of Constantinople, 495–511 
 Symmachus, Pope of the Roman Catholic Church, p. 498–514

References